Kevin van Essen (born 18 August 1989 in Naarden) is a Dutch professional footballer who last played as a midfielder for Telstar in the Dutch Eerste Divisie.

Club career
Van Essen played for FC Omniworld and amateur side Argon before joining Eerste Divisie outfit Telstar in 2012.

Anti-doping rule violation
In July 2015 it was announced that van Essen had tested positive for the diuretic Furosemide in a control in May. He received a two-year suspension in December 2015 and considered a return to a former job in construction.

References

External links
 Voetbal International profile 

1989 births
Living people
Dutch footballers
Doping cases in association football
Dutch sportspeople in doping cases
Almere City FC players
SC Telstar players
Eerste Divisie players
People from Naarden
SV Argon players
Association football midfielders
Footballers from North Holland